The Memory Band is an English folk group founded by Stephen Cracknell. The Memory Band has a rolling cast of collaborators from across the musical spectrum. They made their name with their eponymous debut album released on their own Hungry Hill label and forged their reputation as a live act at emerging British Festivals such as The Green Man Festival, End Of The Road and Homefires.

High profile former members of the band include Al Doyle, Adem, Simon Lord from Simian and Black Ghosts, Nancy Wallace and Lisa Knapp.

Their third album "Oh My Days" was released in February 2011 and features contributions from young soul singer Liam Bailey, Hannah Caughlin from The Accidental, Jess Roberts, folksinger Jenny McCormick, bass player Jon Thorne from Lamb and drummer Tom Page from experimental electronic duo Rocketnumbernine.

The Memory Band also tour performing the music and songs from Paul Giovanni's score from the 1973 film The Wicker Man.

Discography

Albums

The Memory Band (26 July 2004)
Apron Strings (Peacefrog Records, 10 October 2006)
Oh My Days (7 February 2011)
On The Chalk (Our Navigation Of The Line Of The Downs) (2013)
A Fair Field (2016)
Colours (2021)

EPs

Calling On (27 January 2003)
Fanny Adams (11 August 2003)

Singles

"Why"/"Come Write Me Down" (25 September 2006)

References

External links
 The Memory Band
 Video: The Memory Band play Heart Like An Ocean on PSL, February 2008
 review of "Apron Strings" on outsideleft.com
 Interview with Stephen Cracknell July 07 at Mountain*7

English folk musical groups
British folk rock groups
Peacefrog Records artists